Love & Life is the fourth studio album by American R&B singer Eric Benét. It was released on September 9, 2008 on Friday and Reprise Records. The album debuted at number 11 on the US Billboard 200 and number two on Top R&B/Hip-Hop Albums chart with first-week sales of 40,000 copies, making it his highest-charting album since A Day in the Life in 1999. Love & Life also received two 2009 Grammy Award nominations, for Best R&B Album and for Best Male R&B Vocal Performance for "You're the Only One".

Critical reception

AllMusic editor Stephen Thomas Erlewine rated the album three and a half stars out of five and wrote: "Benét returns to what he does best on Love & Life: making music for love-making. Slow and sultry and steeped in Stevie, Marvin, Luther, and especially Quincy Jones-produced Michael Jackson and Prince's forays into quiet storm, Love & Life is a consolidation of Benét's strengths as a seduction artist. Arriving after the turgid turmoil of Hurricane, this is frankly a relief, as Benét demonstrates a lighter touch throughout Love & Life, shedding any suggestion of personal revelation in favor of courting clichés without blushing."

Track listing

Cover versions
English band Blue released a cover version of "You're the Only One" on their album Colours in 2015.

Charts

Weekly charts

Year-end charts

References

2008 albums
Eric Benét albums
Reprise Records albums